Warren Township is one of the twenty-four townships of Trumbull County, Ohio, United States.  The 2000 census found 7,817 people in the township.

Geography
Warren Township is located at 41°14'18" North, 80°48'52" West (41.238206, -80.814554).  Located in the southwestern part of the county, it borders the following townships and village:
Champion Township - north
Bazetta Township - northeast corner
Howland Township - east
Weathersfield Township - southeast
Lordstown - south
Newton Township - southwest corner
Braceville Township - west
Southington Township - northwest corner

A significant part of the city of Warren, the county seat of Trumbull County, is located in eastern Warren Township, and the census-designated place of Leavittsburg is located in the township's west.

According to the United States Census Bureau, the township has a total area of 14.5 square miles (37.5 km), of which, 14.5 square miles (37.5 km) of it is land and none of the area is covered with water.

Name and history
It is one of five Warren Townships statewide.

Government
The township is governed by a three-member board of trustees, who are elected in November of odd-numbered years to a four-year term beginning on the following January 1. Two are elected in the year after the presidential election and one is elected in the year before it. There is also an elected township fiscal officer, who serves a four-year term beginning on April 1 of the year after the election, which is held in November of the year before the presidential election. Vacancies in the fiscal officership or on the board of trustees are filled by the remaining trustees.

References

External links
County website

Townships in Trumbull County, Ohio
Townships in Ohio